The 2011 Júbilo Iwata season was Júbilo Iwata's 18th consecutive season in J.League Division 1 and 29th overall in the Japanese top flight. It also included the 2011 J.League Cup, and the 2011 Emperor's Cup.

Players

Out on loan

Transfers

Winter

In:

Out:

Summer

In:

Out:

Competitions

J.League

Results by round

Matches

League table

J.League Cup

Emperor's Cup

Squad statistics

Appearances and goals

|}

Top Scorers

Disciplinary record

References

Jubilo Iwata
Júbilo Iwata seasons